Henderson Forsythe (September 11, 1917 – April 17, 2006) was an American actor. Forsythe was known for his role as Dr. David Stewart #2 on the soap opera As the World Turns, a role he played for 32 years, and for his work on the New York stage.

Biography

Early life
Forsythe was born in Macon, Missouri, the son of Mary Katherine (née Henderson) and Cecil Proctor Forsythe.  He grew up in Monroe City, Missouri where he first studied theatre.  He transferred from Culver Stockton College to The University of Iowa in 1938.

While attending Culver-Stockton College, he was an active member of Mu Theta Nu Fraternity.

Theatre
In 1979, Forsythe won the Tony Award for Best Featured Actor (Musical) for his work in The Best Little Whorehouse in Texas. He also appeared onstage in dramas such as Who's Afraid of Virginia Woolf by Edward Albee, where he was in the original production taking over the role of George originated by Arthur Hill, and The Birthday Party by Harold Pinter. He also appeared as Andrew Jorgensen in the off-broadway play Other People's Money. He was first to perform as the Auditor in Samuel Beckett's Not I, opposite Jessica Tandy.

Television and film
His television credits included a recurring role as Big Bud on the television series Eight is Enough, which he reprised for another television series starring Scott Bakula called Eisenhower and Lutz. He appeared in many movies, such as Silkwood and Chances Are. In 1965, he briefly carried his As the World Turns character, Dr. David Stewart, over to the prime time soap Our Private World. Other soap operas on which he appeared are From These Roots and The Edge of Night.

Personal life
Forsythe married actress Dorothea Maria Carlson on May 26, 1942 (d. November, 2010). They had two sons, Eric, a professor at The University of Iowa and Jason, a writer. He died of undisclosed causes, aged 88, at Williamsburg Landing in Williamsburg, Virginia.

Filmography

References

External links 
 
 
 

1917 births
2006 deaths
American male film actors
American male musical theatre actors
American male soap opera actors
Male actors from Missouri
People from Macon, Missouri
People from Williamsburg, Virginia
Tony Award winners
People from Monroe City, Missouri
20th-century American male actors
20th-century American male singers
20th-century American singers